The RBC Tennis Championships of Dallas (formerly known as Challenger of Dallas) is a professional tennis tournament played on indoor hard courts. It is currently part of the ATP Challenger Tour. It is held annually at the T Bar M Racquet Club in Dallas, United States, since 1998.

Former RBC Tennis Championships of Dallas players include former world No.1 and 16-time doubles Grand Slam winners, Mike and Bob Bryan, 2014 Wimbledon doubles champions, Jack Sock and Vasek Pospisil, U.S. Open finalist Kei Nishikori, Career Golden Slam achiever, Daniel Nestor, former world No.4, James Blake, Sam Querrey, Kyle Edmund, Frances Tiafoe and Steve Johnson.

Past finals

Singles

Doubles

External links
Official website
ITF search

ATP Challenger Tour
Hard court tennis tournaments in the United States
Sports competitions in Dallas
Challenger of Dallas
Recurring sporting events established in 1998